Church of St Mary is a  Grade I listed church in Everton, Bedfordshire, England. It became a listed building on 26 November 1986. Its most famous rector was John Berridge, an early Methodist leader.

See also
Grade I listed buildings in Bedfordshire

References

Church of England church buildings in Bedfordshire
Grade I listed churches in Bedfordshire